NNC 38-1049 is a histamine antagonist selective for the H3 subtype. It has anorectic effects in animal studies and is being researched as a potential treatment for obesity.

References

Carboxamides
Aromatic ketones
Chloroarenes
H3 receptor antagonists
Piperazines
Cyclopentanes